Julia Wachaczyk and Nina Zander were the defending champions, but neither player competed this year.

Alexandra Nancarrow and Maria Sakkari won the tournament, defeating Emma Laine and Anastasia Pivovarova in the final, 6–2, 6–3.

Seeds

Draw

References 
 Draw

Tampere Open - Women's Doubles
2014 WD